Nes is a village in Nes Municipality on the southwest coast of the Faroese island of Eysturoy.

History
The 2005 population of the village of Nes was 230.
Besides Nes, the two other towns of Toftir and Saltnes are part of Nes Municipality, which has a total population of 1,267 (as of 31.09.2009). Its postal code is FO 655. Nes was the site of a British military installation during World War II. Nes means cape in the Faroese language, a word related to the English word ness with the same meaning.

Frederik's Church in Nes

Frederick's Church  (Fríðrikskirkjan) was designed by the Faroese architect Høgni Würdig Larsen and was completed on November 27, 1994. It was named in honour of clergyman Fríðrikur Petersen (April 22, 1853 - April 27, 1917) who had served as dean in Nes from 1900 to 1917.

Noted natives and residents
 Heine Havreki, (ca. 1514 - 1576) Norwegian born Parish priest
 V.U. Hammershaimb, (1819-1909), Linguist, Lutheran priest and Rural Dean
 Fríðrikur Petersen, (1853-1917), Lutheran priest, Rural Dean, Poet, Member of Parliament

See also
 List of towns in the Faroe Islands

References

External links

 Danish site with photographs of Nes
 Nes Municipality

Populated places in the Faroe Islands
Eysturoy